Achim Weber (born March 11, 1969) is a German football coach and a former player.

References

External links
 

Living people
1969 births
Association football forwards
German footballers
German football managers
2. Bundesliga players
SC Fortuna Köln players
Wuppertaler SV players
Rot-Weiß Oberhausen players
VfL Bochum players
Rot-Weiss Essen players
SSVg Velbert managers
West German footballers